Roger Alan Murrah (born November 20, 1946) is a songwriter and independent music publisher who has written hits for artists including Waylon Jennings, Alan Jackson, Al Jarreau, and Alabama.

Biography

Early life
Roger Murrah was born on November 20, 1946, in Athens, Alabama.

Career
After working in the late 1960s as a staff writer, he opened his own studio in Huntsville, Alabama. He then moved to Nashville, Tennessee and in 1972 made his first appearance on the national charts with "It's Raining in Seattle" by Wynn Stewart. In 1990, he started his own publishing company, Murrah Music and in 1992 was named Billboard's Independent Publisher of the Year. Murrah signees include: Mark Alan Springer, Neal Coty, Rachel Proctor, Luke Bryan, Rebecca Lynn Howard, Steve Azar, Phillip White, Rachel Thibodeau, Michael Mobley, Jimmy Melton and Jon Henderson. His songs have been recorded by artists including: Al Jarreau, Alan Jackson, Barbara Mandrell, Tanya Tucker, The Oak Ridge Boys, Wynonna Judd, Mel Tillis, Take 6, Alabama, Conway Twitty, Ronnie Milsap, and Waylon Jennings.

He was inducted into the Nashville Songwriters Hall of Fame in 2005. Additionally, he has served five terms as Chairman of the Nashville Songwriters Hall of Fame Foundation (NaSHOF), and two consecutive terms as president of the Nashville Songwriters Association International (NSAI).

Number one hits 
 "Southern Rains" — Mel Tillis 1981
 "Life's Highway" — Steve Wariner 1986
 "Hearts Aren't Made to Break (They're Made to Love)" — Lee Greenwood 1986
 "It Takes a Little Rain (To Make Love Grow)" — Oak Ridge Boys 1987
 "This Crazy Love" — Oak Ridge Boys 1987
 "High Cotton" — Alabama 1989
 "Southern Star" — Alabama 1990
 "Don't Rock the Jukebox" — Alan Jackson 1991
 "I'm in a Hurry (And Don't Know Why)" — Alabama 1992
 "If I Could Make a Living" — Clay Walker 1994

Awards 
 1988 BMI Songwriter of the Year
 1980's BMI Songwriter of the Decade 
 BMI Millionaire Airplay Award (for over one million radio performances of Al Jarreau's "We're in This Love Together.")
 3rd BMI Millionaire Airplay Award (for over three million radio performances of Al Jarreau's "We're in This Love Together.")
 CMA Song Of The Year Nomination (1991) Alan Jackson's "Don't Rock the Jukebox."
 CMA Song Of The Year Nomination (1992) Alan Jackson's "Don't Rock the Jukebox."
 BMI 2nd Millionaire Airplay Award (for over two million radio performances of  Alan Jackson's "Don't Rock the Jukebox.")
 BMI Millionaire Airplay Award  (for over one million radio performances of Wynonna's "Only Love.")
 BMI 2nd Millionaire Airplay Award (for over two million radio performances of  Alabama's "High Cotton.")
 BMI Millionaire Airplay Award  (for over one million radio performances of Alabama's "Southern Star.")
 BMI 2nd Millionaire Airplay Award (for over two million radio performances of  Alabama's "I'm In A Hurry (And Don't Know Why).")
 BMI 2nd Millionaire Airplay Award (for over two million radio performances of  Tanya Tucker's "It's a Little Too Late.")
 BMI Millionaire Airplay Award  (for over one million radio performances of The Oak Ridge Boys' "This Crazy Love.")
 BMI Millionaire Airplay Award  (for over one million radio performances of Travis Tritt's "Where Corn Don't Grow.")

References

External links 
 Murrah Music website
 Nashville Songwriters Hall of Fame
 In The Spotlight Feature Interview 2010
 Interview, HitQuarters June 2009
 American Songwriter February 19, 2009
 Alabama Music Hall of Fame
 American Chronicle Feature 2006
 Bluegrass Journal February 18, 2010
 BMI Music World Feature Interview, June 2006
 NAMM Oral History Program Interview, July 2009
 MusicRow September 7, 2010

1946 births
Living people
People from Athens, Alabama
Musicians from Nashville, Tennessee
American country songwriters
American male songwriters
Songwriters from Tennessee
Songwriters from Alabama